"The Baddest" is a song recorded by Filipino boy band BGYO, released on August 20, 2021 as a fifth single of their debut album The Light. It was written and composed by Tha Aristocratz and TC Mack, along with Jonathan Manalo and BGYO's Angelo Troy Rivera and Akira Morishita. The track was one of the BGYO songs—"Kundiman", "He's Into Her", "The Baddest"—chosen to be part of The Lunar Codex's "Polaris Collection" time capsules bound to the Moon in 2023.

"The Baddest" was featured on Spotify's Radar Philippines and New Music Friday Philippines playlists upon its release. Ten days after, it surpassed 200,000 streams on Spotify, the fastest among BGYO songs to hit this benchmark.

The accompanying music video of "The Baddest" has received numerous validation from the netizens, as it trended on YouTube and peaked at number 6 upon its release. Seven days after, its official music video surpassed 1 million views on YouTube, the second fastest music video of the group after, "The Light" and also among the fastest P-pop tracks to hit this milestone.

Composition and lyrics
"The Baddest" runs for a total of three minutes and sixteen seconds, set in common time with a tempo of 93 beats per minute and written in the key of C♯/D♭ major. Most of its lyrics were written in English, except with the rap parts as it was written in Filipino by BGYO's Gelo and Akira that speaks about an absolute appreciation of someone.

Background and release
Prior to the official release, cryptic video teasers and concept photos circulated in the social media that fuels ACEs (the fans) with theories stemming the involvement of the Filipina actress Liza Soberano on the comeback. The official track of "The Baddest" was released earlier than its official music video on 20 August 2021. Eight days after, the lyric video of "The Baddest" was released.

Promotion

Live performances
On 29 October 2022, the group performed "The Baddest" on the first ever K-pop Halloween Concert in the Philippines—Hallyuween 2022.

Television
On 5 September 2021, "The Baddest" debuted on television through ASAP Natin 'To.  On 18 September 2021, the group performed it live on It's Showtime.

Virtual
On 29 August 2021, the group performed "The Baddest" on "Happy Hallyu Day 5: A Virtual Fest". The group also appeared on "Push Bets Live" on 1 September 2021. On 8 September 2022, the group opened the Lazada 9.9 Megasale Super Show with their performance of "The Baddest".

Music video
The music video for "The Baddest" was produced by YouMeUs MNL, directed by Amiel Kirby Balagtas and written by Edgar Dale Reciña, who also worked with the group's music video of "He's Into Her". It was presented in a sci-fi action concept wherein Gelo, Akira, JL, Mikki, and Nate played spies of the "ACEs Elite Secret Service" along with the head agent portrayed by Liza Soberano as "Binibining Haliya", taking revenge to Bakunawa - a great and frightening serpent-like dragon in Philippine mythology.

Use in popular culture
On 8 October 2021, American hip-hop dance crew Jabbawockeez posted a short dance cover of "The Baddest" in different social media platforms and went viral.

See also
BGYO discography
List of BGYO live performances

Notes

References

External links
 

BGYO songs
2021 songs
Star Music singles
Taglish songs